Borderline is a 2002 American psychological thriller television film directed by Evelyn Maude Purcell, about borderline personality disorder. It was released to lukewarm reception.

Synopsis 
During her divorce, Dr. Lila Coletti (Gina Gershon), a criminal psychiatrist, loses custody of her two daughters, partially because her job working with the criminally insane is dangerous.
At about the same time, a supposedly cured psychopathic patient, Ed Baikman (Sean Patrick Flanery), is released. When Lila's husband and his girlfriend are murdered, Ed seems the obvious suspect, especially since the m.o. is identifiably his. Yet there are other reasons for suspecting that the real culprit is Lila.

Cast 
Gina Gershon as Dr. Lila Coletti
Michael Biehn as Detective Macy Kobacek
Sean Patrick Flanery as Ed Baikman
Louise Barnes as Karen Kendler

External links
 

2002 television films
2002 films
2002 crime thriller films
Films scored by Anthony Marinelli
Films about dissociative identity disorder
Borderline personality disorder in fiction